Hinton railway station was a station on the Midland Railway between Tewkesbury and Evesham, England. It opened 1 October 1864 by the Midland Railway. The station served Hinton-on-the-Green in Worcestershire.

During World War II, the area surrounding the station was used as a military fuel dump and it was subject to at least one unsuccessful air attack. Following the station's closure in 1963, the area was used by several companies for storage including the local Midlands Electricity Board who used it to store electrical mains equipment.

References

Further reading

Disused railway stations in Worcestershire
Railway stations in Great Britain opened in 1864
Railway stations in Great Britain closed in 1963
Former Midland Railway stations